Felipe da Silva Amorim (born 4 January 1991), commonly known as Felipe Amorim, is a Brazilian professional football player who plays as a forward for Chiangrai United in Thai League 1.

Honours

Club
Chiangrai United
 Thai FA Cup (1): 2020–21

References

External links

Living people
1991 births
Brazilian footballers
Association football forwards
Campeonato Brasileiro Série B players
Goiás Esporte Clube players
Paraná Clube players
Ceará Sporting Club players
América Futebol Clube (MG) players
Fluminense FC players
Coritiba Foot Ball Club players
Figueirense FC players
Guarani FC players
Felipe Amorim
Footballers from Brasília